Richard Vincent Molloy (15 October 1918 – 29 January 1995) was an Australian rules footballer who played with Essendon and North Melbourne in the Victorian Football League (VFL).

Between his stints with Essendon and North Melbourne, Molloy served in the Australian Army during World War II.

Notes

External links 
		

1918 births
1995 deaths
Australian rules footballers from Victoria (Australia)
Essendon Football Club players
North Melbourne Football Club players
Sandhurst Football Club players